is a park in Katsushika ward, Tokyo, Japan. It is the biggest park within the 23 special wards of Tokyo. It is known for its diverse plants and wild birds, and as an attraction spot during the Hanami season. Locals have said that it is home to a haunted phone booth.

Data
 Date opened: April 1, 1965
 Area:  
 Nearest station: About  from Kanamachi Station (JR Jōban Line); a bus service to the park is available.

Transportation
When Katsushika Shōbu Festival is held, Mizumoto Katsushika Shōbu Meguri Bus are run by Keisei Bus on holidays in June. And, the bus is bound for Horikiri-Shobuen Station via Kanamachi Station and Shibamata Taishakuten. It takes 220 yen to ride on the bus.

Education
Katsushika City Board of Education operates area public elementary and junior high schools.

2-8-ban are zoned to Higashi-Mizumoto Elementary School (東水元小学校) while 1-ban is zoned to Handa Elementary School (半田小学校).

3-8-ban are zoned to Mizumoto Junior High School (水元中学校) while 1-2-ban are zoned to Higashi Kanamachi Junior High School (東金町中学校).

References

External links
 Mizumoto Park, Tokyo Metropolitan Park Association
 Jōdoron kōen, Jōdoron kōen By Kōon Mizumoto

Parks and gardens in Tokyo
Hanami spots of Japan
Katsushika